Ivar Bjare (30 April 1943 – 24 November 1995) was a Swedish luger. He competed in the men's singles and doubles events at the 1968 Winter Olympics.

References

1943 births
1995 deaths
Swedish male lugers
Olympic lugers of Sweden
Lugers at the 1968 Winter Olympics
Sportspeople from Stockholm